Starobesheve Raion was one of the raions of Donetsk Oblast, located in southeastern Ukraine. The raion was abolished on 18 July 2020 as part of the administrative reform of Ukraine, which reduced the number of raions of Donetsk Oblast to eight. However, since 2014 the raion was not under control of Ukrainian government and has been part of the Donetsk People's Republic which continues using it as an administrative unit. The administrative center of the raion is the urban-type settlement of Starobesheve.

Demographics 
According to the 2001 Ukrainian Census:

References

Former raions of Donetsk Oblast
1923 establishments in Ukraine
Ukrainian raions abolished during the 2020 administrative reform